Adriana Garroni (born 1966) is an Italian mathematician specializing in mathematical analysis, including the calculus of variations, geometric measure theory, potential theory, and applications to the mathematical modeling of materials including plasticity and fracture. She is a professor in mathematics at Sapienza University of Rome.

Education and career
Garroni was born on 22 March 1966 in Rome, and despite having mathematics professor Maria Giovanna Garroni as her mother, she grew up torn between mathematics and the arts.

After earning a laurea in mathematics in 1991 from Sapienza University of Rome, she went to the International School for Advanced Studies (SISSA) in Trieste for graduate study in functional analysis with Gianni Dal Maso, earning an M.Phil. in 1993 and completing her Ph.D. in 1994.

She returned to Sapienza University as a researcher in 1995, became an associate professor in 1998, and was named full professor in 2017.

References

External links
Home page

Interview with Garroni at the 20th Congress of the Italian Mathematical Union, 2015 (in Italian)

1966 births
Living people
Italian mathematicians
Italian women mathematicians
Sapienza University of Rome alumni
International School for Advanced Studies alumni
Academic staff of the Sapienza University of Rome